Maccarone may refer to people with the surname Maccarone:
 Angelina Maccarone (born 1965), German film director. screenwriter and professor
 Giordano Maccarone (born 1990), Italian footballer
 Juan Carlos Maccarone (1940–2015), Argentine Roman Catholic bishop
 Massimo Maccarone (born 1979), Italian footballer
 Sam Maccarone (born 1975), American film actor, director and writer
 Grace Maccarone, children's book editor and author
 Gustavo Maccarone (born 1987), Brazilian offensive midfielder
 Sal Maccarone (born 1949), American kinetic sculptor

See also
 Maccarone (art gallery), a New York art gallery
 McCarron